Jean Galli de Bibiena (French rendering of Galli da Bibbiena) was an 18th-century French-speaking writer (but of Italian descent), born in 1709 in Nancy and who may have died in 1779 in Italy. He was the son of Francesco Galli Bibiena, of the famous Galli da Bibiena family.

Biography 
Little is known about him, except that he chose France and literature whereas his family was primarily composed of decorative painters and theater architects. If his first two novels "felt a little too foreign," "the following novels were more in the French taste [...] They took place in the traditional world of the sentimental and gallant novel."

Published in 1747, his novel La Poupée ("The Doll") tells the story of a sylph who teaches love to "a young priest still virgin and very conceited". If we can consider that this novel fits into the current of libertinage, it is nevertheless appropriate to distinguish it from the works of Crébillon, Sade or Choderlos de Laclos insofar Bibiena, through his characters, presented more an aesthetic pleasure and an art of seduction in which the relations of power and conquest idea played a much smaller role than in other libertine novels of the eighteenth century.

In 1762, his play La nouvelle Italie met some success.

In 1763, he was convicted of raping a girl and "sentenced to death in absentia since he fled immediately." He may have died in Italy in 1779.

Publications 
1735: Mémoires et aventures de Monsieur de ***, translated from Italian by himself 
1741: Histoire des amours de Valérie et du noble vénitien Barbarigo 
1746: Le Petit toutou 
1747: La Poupée 
1748: La Force de l'exemple
1750: Le Triomphe du sentiment
1762: La Nouvelle Italie, heroïco-humorous Italiano-Franco theatre play created at Comédie Italienne 23 June.

References

External links 
 Jean-Galli de Bibiena on data.bnf.fr

Writers from Nancy, France
1709 births
18th-century French dramatists and playwrights
18th-century French writers
18th-century French male writers
1779 deaths